The twenty Central Plateau languages are a residual branch of the Plateau family spoken in central Nigeria. Tyap (or Katab) has over 200,000 speakers, and the closely related Jju (or Kaje) has well over 300,000. Hyam (or Jabba) has another 100,000. Cori is famous for being one of very few languages with six tone levels, though only three are needed for writing.

Classification
The Central Plateau languages are a close geographical group with numerous connections; however, they are to some extent a residual group and may be a sprachbund. The following classification is taken from Blench (2008). A distinction between North Plateau and the rest of Central Plateau is possible but appears to be geographic; Gerhardt (1994) argues they belong together.

Each of the second-level bullets is a single language or dialect cluster and is obviously valid. However, most of the first-level groups (Hyamic, North Plateau, Gyongic, Koro) are not self-evident and may continue to be revised.

Rigwe (Irigwe)
Izeric
Izere: NE & NW Izere, Cèn, Ganàng
Fəràn (Firan) – clearly related to Izere
Tyapic
Tyap (Katab): Tyap proper, Gworok, Takat (Attakar), Tyecha̱rak (Kacecere), Sholyia̱ (Sholio), Fantswam (Kafanchan), Tyuku
Jju (Kaje) – probably part of the Tyap cluster
Hyamic
Cori (Kyoli)
Dangana
Hyam (Jabba): Hyam of Nok, Sait, Dzar; maybe Yaat, Ankun also separate
Shamang
Zhire (Shang is relexified Zhire)
Koro
Koro: Ashe, Begbere-Ejar
Yeskwa (Nyankpa)
Idun, Gwara
Gyongic
Gyong (Kagoma)
Nghan (Kamantan)
North Plateau (Northwest)
Adara (Eda, Edra)
Kuturmi
Kulu (Ikulu)
Idon
Doka
Iku (Iku-Gora-Ankwe)

Blench (2018) splits the Central Plateau languages into a Northwest Plateau group consisting of Eda/Edra, Acro-Obiro (Kuturmi), Kulu, Idon, Doka, Iku-Gora-Ankwe, and a West-Central Plateau linguistic area consisting of the Rigwe, Tyapic, Izeric, Hyamic, Koro, and Gyongic groups.

Many of the languages, including Jju, were formerly classified as part of a Southern Zaria group in earlier classifications.

Names and locations
Below is a list of language names, populations, and locations from Blench (2019).

Footnotes

References
Blench, Roger (2008). Prospecting proto-Plateau. Manuscript.

External links
Plateau materials from Roger Blench

 
Plateau languages